Backless is the sixth full-length studio album by Eric Clapton. Produced by Glyn Johns, and released by RSO Records, Backless reached No. 8 on the pop charts. While the single "Promises" only reached No. 37 in the UK, it was a much bigger success in the US, reaching No. 9 on the Billboard charts. The follow-up single, "Watch Out for Lucy", was the B-side of "Promises",  but reached No. 40 on the Billboard charts on its own merit. Later in 1980 "Tulsa Time" was US #30 with 1977 song "Cocaine" as B-side. It was Clapton's last studio album to feature his longtime bassist Carl Radle who died in 1980.

Track listing
"Walk Out in the Rain" (Bob Dylan, Helena Springs) – 4:16
"Watch Out for Lucy" (Eric Clapton) – 3:26
"I'll Make Love to You Anytime" (J. J. Cale) – 3:23
"Roll It" (Clapton, Marcy Levy) – 3:42
"Tell Me That You Love Me" (Clapton) – 3:31
"If I Don't Be There by Morning" (Dylan, Springs) – 4:38
"Early in the Morning" (Traditional, arranged by Eric Clapton) – 5:25 (LP)/7:58 (CD)
"Promises" (Richard Feldman, Roger Linn) – 3:04
"Golden Ring" (Clapton) – 3:32
"Tulsa Time" (Danny Flowers) – 3:28

Singles
 1978 – "Promises" (#37 UK; #9 US)
 1979 – "Promises" (International)
 1979 – "Watch Out for Lucy" (#40 US)
 1979 – "Walk Out in the Rain"

Personnel 
 Eric Clapton – guitars, lead vocals, arrangements on "Early In the Morning"
 Dick Sims – keyboards
 George Terry – guitars
 Carl Radle – bass, backing vocals
 Jamie Oldaker – drums, percussion, backing vocals
 Marcy Levy – backing vocals (lead vocals on "Roll It")
 Benny Gallagher and Graham Lyle – backing vocals on "Golden Ring"

Production 
 Producer and Engineer – Glyn Johns
 Assistant Engineer – Jon Astley
 Art Direction and Design – David Stewart and Nello
 Photography – Nello
 Additional Photography – Rob Fraboni, Andy Seymour and Laura K. Sims.

Chart performance

Certifications

References

Eric Clapton albums
1978 albums
Albums produced by Glyn Johns
RSO Records albums
Albums recorded at Olympic Sound Studios